Austin Starke Taylor Jr. (July 2, 1922 – October 27, 2014) was mayor of Dallas, Texas, from 1983 to 1987, and a cotton investor.

Biography
Taylor was born on July 2, 1922, in Paris, Texas, in Lamar County to Austin Starke Taylor Sr. and Veryl Georgette Lamb. He married Delores Myrlee Burris, daughter of Clarke E. Burris on August 29, 1942, in Durant, Oklahoma. They had three children: Austin Starke III, Janet Charlene, and Charles Claiborne. He and Mrs. Taylor divorced in 1973. He married Carolyn Wray Norman Markle on April 7, 1973, in Dallas.

Starke Taylor graduated from Highland Park High School in 1939 where he was editor of the yearbook. In 1943 he graduated from Rice University, at the time called Rice Institute. While there he was elected president of the sophomore class.
 
He served in the Navy during World War II. His father, Starke Taylor Sr., was involved in buying and selling cotton and served a term as mayor of Highland Park. Stark Taylor Jr. joined his father's firm in 1946 and assumed control when is father retired in 1962. He sold the firm in 1982.

He served on the Parks and Recreation Board under Jack Evans. He defeated City Councilman and former Mayor Wes Wise in an election where he outspent the other candidate 10 to 1. In his 1985 re-election campaign, he defeated Max Goldblatt.

Starke Taylor Jr., CEO, Taylor Investments was on the 2012 AT&T College Bowl Board. He was also president of the Cotton Council International.

Death
Taylor died at his home in Dallas on October 27, 2014.

References

1922 births
2014 deaths
Businesspeople from Texas
Highland Park High School (University Park, Texas) alumni
Rice University alumni
Mayors of Dallas
People from Paris, Texas
Texas Republicans
United States Navy personnel of World War II
20th-century American businesspeople